The 1949–50 season was the Tri-Cities Blackhawks' fourth season of play and first in the National Basketball Association (NBA).

Roster

Regular season
On October 29th, the Blackhawks defeated the Denver Nuggets in the first ever NBA game following the NBL–BAA merger.

Season standings

Record vs. opponents

Game log

Playoffs

|- align="center" bgcolor="#ffcccc"
| 1
| March 16
| @ Anderson
| L 77–89
| Jack Nichols (27)
| Anderson High School Wigwam
| 0–1
|- align="center" bgcolor="#ccffcc"
| 2
| March 18
| Anderson
| W 76–75
| Jack Nichols (23)
| Wharton Field House
| 1–1
|- align="center" bgcolor="#ffcccc"
| 3
| March 24
| @ Anderson
| L 71–94
| Dike Eddleman (23)
| Anderson High School Wigwam
| 1–2
|-

References

Atlanta Hawks seasons
Tri-Cities
Atlanta Hawks
Atlanta Hawks